Crematogaster biformis is a species of ant in tribe Crematogastrini. It was described by Andre in 1892.

References

biformis
Insects described in 1892